Lucinda "Cindy" Rosenwald (born April 23, 1954) is a Democratic state senator for the 13th district of New Hampshire, representing six of Nashua's nine wards since 2018. Rosenwald serves on the Senate Capital Budget, Executive Departments & Administration, and Finance committees. She previously was a member of the New Hampshire House of Representatives, representing the Hillsborough 30th District from 2004 until 2018. In the 2006 elections, when the Democrats took over the state house, Rosenwald was one of two freshman representatives to be placed in leadership.

Rosenwald received her bachelor's degree from Harvard University and her master's degree from Rivier College.

Prior to politics, she worked as a writing instructor at Rivier, as well as at New Hampshire College (now Southern New Hampshire University) and UMass Lowell, where she was eventually made an adjunct professor.

On November 6, 2018, Rosenwald defeated David Schoneman to succeed retiring Senator Bette Lasky.

References

External links
New Hampshire House of Representatives - Cindy Rosenwald official NH House website
Project Vote Smart - Representative Cindy Rosenwald (NH) profile
Follow the Money - Cindy Rosenwald
2006 2004 campaign contributions
Official Campaign Website--Cindy Rosenwald

Democratic Party members of the New Hampshire House of Representatives
Democratic Party New Hampshire state senators
1954 births
Living people
Women state legislators in New Hampshire
Harvard College alumni
Rivier University alumni
21st-century American politicians
21st-century American women politicians
Southern New Hampshire University faculty
University of Massachusetts Lowell faculty
American women academics